Oleg Ladik (born 18 September 1971) is a Ukrainian-born Canadian former Olympic wrestler, who won a gold medal in the 1993 Maccabiah Games in Israel. He was born in Kyiv, Ukraine, and lives in Montreal, Quebec.

Wrestling career

Ladik competed for Team Canada in the 1993 Maccabiah Games in Israel, winning a gold medal at 21 years of age.

He competed in the 1996 Summer Olympics, Heavyweight, Freestyle (≤100 kilograms), coming in 8th.

Ladik competed in the 1995 World Wrestling Championship: 100.0 kg. Freestyle (coming in 9th); 1997 World Wrestling Championship: 130.0 kg. Freestyle (coming in 8th); and 1998 World Wrestling Championship: 130.0 kg. Freestyle (coming in 11th).

References

External links
 

1971 births
Jewish Canadian sportspeople
Jewish wrestlers
Living people
Maccabiah Games gold medalists for Canada
Maccabiah Games medalists in wrestling
Competitors at the 1993 Maccabiah Games
Sportspeople from Kyiv
Sportspeople from Montreal
Olympic wrestlers of Canada
Wrestlers at the 1996 Summer Olympics
Canadian male sport wrestlers
Ukrainian emigrants to Canada